University Heights is a city in Cuyahoga County, Ohio,  United States. It borders Beachwood to the east, Cleveland Heights to the west, South Euclid to the north and Shaker Heights to the south. The population was 13,914 as of the 2020 Census. University Heights is nicknamed the "City of Beautiful Homes."  University Heights is closely tied to neighboring Cleveland Heights, with the two sharing a school system, library system, post office and ZIP Code, some city services, and local media outlets. With about half the population under the age of 30, University Heights is home to one of the youngest communities in the region, including both students and families.

History

Originally part of the Warrensville Township, University Heights was incorporated as Idlewood Village in 1908. It adopted its present name in the mid-1920s, when John Carroll University was anticipated to move into the area. John Carroll attracted massive growth and University Heights soon became recognized as a city in 1940.

Geography
University Heights is located at  (41.495019, −81.536864).

Both branches of Dugway Brook rise in University Heights, on or near the campus of John Carroll University. All of the brook within the city was culverted in the early 20th century and now flows under the pavement. Meadowbrook Boulevard traces the winding course of the upper west branch.

Demographics

The median income for a household in the city was $72,519, and the median income for a family was $88,892. The per capita income for the city was $30,081. About 6.2% of the total population were below the poverty line. Of the city's population over the age of 25, 67.0% hold a bachelor's degree or higher, and 90.2% spoke English, 2.1% Spanish, 4.2% Yiddish, 1.8% Hebrew, and 1.7% Russian at home.

2010 census
As of the census of 2010, there were 13,539 people, 4,810 households, and 3,011 families residing in the city. The racial makeup of the city was 71.8% White, 23.1% African American, 0.1% Native American, 2.4% Asian, 0.9% from other races, and 1.6% from two or more races. Hispanic or Latino people of any race were 2.8% of the population.

There were 4,810 households, of which 31.9% had children under the age of 18 living with them, 48.9% were married couples living together, 10.9% had a female householder with no husband present, 2.8% had a male householder with no wife present, and 37.4% were non-families. Of all households, 29.1% were made up of individuals, and 10% had someone living alone who was 65 years of age or older. The average household size was 2.48 and the average family size was 3.11.

The median age in the city was 30.7 years. 22.7% of residents were under the age of 18; 19.7% were between the ages of 18 and 24; 25.8% were from 25 to 44; 20.1% were from 45 to 64; and 11.7% were 65 years of age or older. The gender makeup of the city was 47.7% male and 52.3% female.

2000 census
In 2000, there were 5,163 households, out of which 29.3% had children under the age of 18 living with them, 52.9% were married couples living together, 9.3% had a female householder with no husband present, and 35.7% were non-families. Of all households 29.9% were made up of individuals, and 11.7% had someone living alone who was 65 years of age or older. The average household size was 2.37 and the average family size was 2.99.

In the city, the population was spread out, with 20.8% under the age of 18, 18.9% from 18 to 24, 27.8% from 25 to 44, 19.1% from 45 to 64, and 13.4% who were 65 years of age or older. The median age was 32 years. For every 100 females, there were 89.2 males. For every 100 females age 18 and over, there were 85.2 males.

Government
University Heights has had a strong mayor-council government since 1941.

The city's mayors have been:

 A. R Silsby                   1907–1910 (first mayor of Idlewood)
 Michael Scheinder             1910–1913
 Oscar F. Alexander            1914
 A. R Silsby                   1914–1915
 John J. Howard                1916-1941 
 Earl E. Aurelius              1941–1965
 Irving W. Konigsberg          1966–1977
 Beryl E. Rothschild           1978–2009 (first female and longest-serving mayor)
 Susan K. Infeld               2010–2017
 Michael Dylan Brennan         2018–

Education

Colleges and universities
 John Carroll University

Public schools
Public education in the city of University Heights is provided by the Cleveland Heights-University Heights City School District. Located in University Heights are  Gearity Professional Development School, Cleveland Heights High School (temporary location) and Gearity Early Childhood Center.

Private schools
 Gesu Catholic School
 The Bellefaire JCB provides preschool programs, childcare, counseling and education for children.

References

External links

 

Cities in Ohio
Cities in Cuyahoga County, Ohio
Cleveland metropolitan area
Jewish communities in the United States